Conchita Martínez was the defending champion but did not compete that year.

Isabel Cueto won in the final 6–2, 7–6 against Katerina Maleeva.

Seeds
A champion seed is indicated in bold text while text in italics indicates the round in which that seed was eliminated.

  Katerina Maleeva (final)
  Isabel Cueto (champion)
  Laura Golarsa (first round)
  Petra Langrová (quarterfinals)
  Laura Garrone (first round)
  Sabrina Goleš (quarterfinals)
  Angelika Kanellopoulou (semifinals)
  Sabine Hack (second round)

Draw

External links
 1989 Vitosha New Otani Open Draw

Vitosha New Otani Open
1989 WTA Tour